Richard Gordon Garlick (11 April 1917 – 16 May 1988) was an English cricketer active from 1938 to 1950 who played for Lancashire and Northamptonshire. He appeared in 121 first-class matches as a right arm bowler, deploying both off spin and medium pace seam. He was a righthanded tail-end batsman. Garlick was born in Kirkby Lonsdale, Westmorland, 11 April 1917 and died in Blackpool on 16 May 1988. He was awarded two county caps, Lancashire in 1947 and Northamptonshire in 1949; he left Lancashire after the 1947 season and joined Northants for the 1948 season. He scored 1,663 runs in first-class cricket with a highest score of 62 not out, one of four half-centuries. He took 332 wickets with a best performance of six for 27.

Notes

Sources

 Playfair Cricket Annual – 1948 edition

English cricketers
Lancashire cricketers
Northamptonshire cricketers
1917 births
1988 deaths
People from Kirkby Lonsdale